Batrachylidae is a family of frogs from southern South America (Argentina and Chile). Before being recognized as a family, Batrachylidae was included as a subfamily (Batrachylinae) in the family Ceratophryidae; this is the taxonomy still suggested by the Integrated Taxonomic Information System (ITIS).

Species
There are four genera in the family:
Atelognathus Lynch, 1978 (5 species)
Batrachyla Bell, 1843 (5 species)
Chaltenobatrachus Basso, Úbeda, Bunge, and Martinazzo, 2011 (1 species)
Hylorina Bell, 1843 (1 species)

References